Écalles-Alix is a commune in the Seine-Maritime department in the Normandy region in northern France.

Geography

Population

Places of interest
 The church of St. Martin, dating from the twelfth century.
 The Château de Beauvoir, built in 1638.

See also
Communes of the Seine-Maritime department

References

Communes of Seine-Maritime